Diplocladius is a genus of non-biting midges in the subfamily Orthocladiinae of the bloodworm family Chironomidae.

Species
D. cultriger Kieffer in Kieffer & Thienemann, 1908 (Synonym - D. bilobatus Brundin, 1956)

Chironomidae
Taxa named by Jean-Jacques Kieffer
Nematocera genera